The Thai Liberal Party (abbreviated TLP) is a political party in Thailand founded in 2013 by Paiboon Puangthonglor. On 26 December 2013, the first party executive board resigned from the party to prepare for a change in its executive committee by inviting former Commissioner of the Royal Thai Police Police General Seripisut Temiyavet. The party has a reformist agenda of curbing the power of the military and reducing corruption. As part of the party's political programme, Seripisut has suggested moving military bases out of Bangkok and renting the land to schools, hospitals and parks or to fund similar public amenities, and consolidating "unnecessary" military formations. Seripisut noted, however, that the "police need to be in Bangkok".

Election results

References 

2013 establishments in Thailand
Centre-left parties in Asia
Liberal parties in Thailand
Political parties in Thailand
Political parties established in 2013
Progressive parties
Social liberal parties